Aegiphila fasciculata is a species of tree in the family Lamiaceae. It is native to Central America, where it occurs in Guatemala, Honduras, and Nicaragua. It grows in humid forest habitat.

References

fasciculata
Trees of Guatemala
Trees of Honduras
Trees of Nicaragua
Vulnerable plants
Taxonomy articles created by Polbot